The Hong Kong Film Award for Best Screenplay is an award presented annually at the Hong Kong Film Awards for best screenplay in a Hong Kong film.

Winners and nominees

1980s

1990s

2000s

2010s

2020s

Multiple wins and nominations

Multiple wins

Multiple nominations

References

External links
 Hong Kong Film Awards Official Site

Hong Kong Film Awards